"One" is a song by American heavy metal band Metallica, released as the third and final single from the band's fourth studio album, ...And Justice for All (1988). Written by band members James Hetfield and Lars Ulrich, the song portrays a World War I soldier who is severely wounded—arms, legs and jaw blown off by a landmine, blind and unable to speak or move—begging God to take his life. In the music video, attempting to communicate with the hospital staff he jolts in his bed, spelling "Kill me" in Morse code. Production of the song was done by the band alongside Flemming Rasmussen. The song was the band's first to chart in the U.S., reaching number 35 on the Billboard Hot 100. It was also a number one hit in Finland.

A video for the song was introduced in January 1989 on MTV. Shot in black and white by director Michael Salomon, the video's story is intercut with scenes taken from the 1971 anti-war film Johnny Got His Gun. Due to routinely being required to pay royalty fees to continue showing the music video, Metallica bought the rights to the film. The video was ranked at number one on MTV soon after its introduction.

Metallica performed "One" for the 31st Annual Grammy Awards show broadcast from Los Angeles in 1989. The next year, the song won a Grammy Award for Best Metal Performance, the first ever to win in that category. The band also performed the song alongside pianist Lang Lang at the 56th Annual Grammy Awards in 2014. The song is one of the band's most popular pieces and has remained a staple at live shows since the release of the album, and is the most performed song from ...And Justice for All.

Recording and composition
"One" was written in November 1987 by Metallica's principal composers James Hetfield and Lars Ulrich. The song was released in 1989 as the third and final single of the album. For the first 20 seconds of the song there are a series of sound effects with a battle theme, an artillery barrage and helicopter are heard and continues slightly over a clean tone guitar intro by Hetfield before Kirk Hammett comes in over the top with a clean-toned solo. Ulrich's drums come in and continues until each chorus, when the guitars become heavy and distorted before returning to clean. There is a second solo by Hammett halfway through the song, before lyrics cut out and the song gradually gets more heavy and distorted until the "machine gun" guitar build up (played alongside double bass drums) before the next, often highly praised, guitar solo by Hammett, and a final dual solo by Hammett and Hetfield.

In 1991, James Hetfield told Guitar World that he wrote the song's opening Bm-G chord change based on an idea prompted by the Venom song "Buried Alive" from their second studio album, Black Metal.

The song starts off in a soft melodic setting, but it develops through multiple sections into heavier and faster speed metal sounds, leading up to a tapping solo by Kirk Hammett, and a dual guitar section by Hammett and James Hetfield.

Concept
The song is based on the idea of a soldier losing all of his limbs and jaw and being unable to hear, speak, or see, set to a World War I backdrop. In an interview in New Zealand in 1989, Ulrich describes the movie Johnny Got His Gun as having a similar theme, and this was the reason it was incorporated into the video.

Music video
"One" was the first Metallica song for which a music video was created. The music video, directed by Bill Pope and Michael Salomon, debuted on MTV on January 20, 1989. The video, shot in Long Beach, California on December 7, 1988, is almost entirely in black and white, and features the band performing the song in a warehouse. It features dialogue and several scenes from the 1971 film adaptation of Johnny Got His Gun. Timothy Bottoms can be seen starring as Joe Bonham, the main character in the novel (written by Dalton Trumbo and published in September 1939; the basis for the 1971 film).

Three versions of the "One" music video were made; the first (the longest, album version) contained scenes of both the band and scenes from the movie. The second was simply a shortened version of the first, and the third, often known as the "jammin' version", lacked scenes from the movie (the song and video fades at the last bridge in the third version).

Like many other music videos from Metallica, "One" puts great emphasis on the performances of the band members as musicians, with many shots of Hetfield, Jason Newsted and Hammett's hands picking and fretting. The video features the band members in a typical early Metallica fashion: playing (as if in rehearsal) in some sort of warehouse, in tight formation around Lars Ulrich's drum kit, and dressed in casual street clothes and with long untamed hair.

In the music video, both Hetfield and Hammett play ESP guitars; Newsted is on a 5-string Wal bass. Newsted plays bass with his fingers at the start of the song, but later switches to a pick.

Two of the three versions of the "One" music video appear on 2 of One, a VHS released on July 1, 1990, and both would again be featured on the band's 2006 music video compilation DVD.

The music video was ranked at number 38 on Rock on the Net: MTV: 100 Greatest Music Videos and number one on Fuse's No. 1 Countdown: Rock and Roll Hall of Fame Special Edition.

As of November 14, 2022, the video has over 269 million views on YouTube.

Live performance
"One" is a fixture of the band's live performances. When played live, the song is usually played with guitars tuned down by one semitone (a permanent fixture of their studio and live work since 1995, save for Death Magnetic and Hardwired... to Self-Destruct in the case of the former) and is preceded by pyrotechnics and the same sounds of war such as machine guns, and bombs exploding as heard on the recorded version. The song also features heavy strobe lighting during the heavier half of the song, namely before the Hammett solo.

The song was also featured on S&M and S&M2, Metallica's albums of live performances in collaboration with the San Francisco Symphony Orchestra, conducted by Michael Kamen, and Michael Tilson Thomas respectively. Another notable performance was at the Grammy Awards 2014, when pianist Lang Lang accompanied the band on an acoustic grand piano.

Track listing

"One" single

"One" (live) single

Personnel
 James Hetfield – vocals, rhythm guitar
 Kirk Hammett – lead guitar
 Jason Newsted – bass
 Lars Ulrich – drums

Charts

Weekly charts

Year-end charts

Certifications

Honors
"One" was voted as the seventh of the "100 Greatest Guitar Solos" of all time by readers of Guitar World, placed between "November Rain" by Guns N' Roses (sixth) and "Hotel California" by the Eagles (eighth).
In 2011, a poll held by Gibson ranked the song the eighth greatest heavy metal song of all time.
In 2002, 2009, 2011 and 2012, "One" was voted by listeners of the New Zealand radio station The Rock as the greatest rock song of all time.
"One" was nominated for and won the first ever Grammy Award for Best Metal Performance in 1990.

Legacy
Guitarist Dino Cazares said in 2022 that the "machine gun" guitar part had a huge influence on him and it inspired him to play guitar riffs in that style exclusively in Fear Factory, which later became his trademark.

See also

 List of anti-war songs
 Locked-in syndrome

References

External links
 
 Classic Tracks: Metallica 'One'

Metallica songs
1980s ballads
1988 songs
1989 singles
Elektra Records singles
Grammy Award for Best Metal Performance
Music videos directed by Michael Salomon
Number-one singles in Finland
Songs written by James Hetfield
Songs written by Lars Ulrich
Anti-war songs
Heavy metal ballads
Speed metal songs